Lieutenant-General Edward Harvey (1718–1778) of Cleveland Court, Westminster was a British Army officer who served as Adjutant-General to the Forces.

Early life
He was born the youngest son of William Harvey and Mary (née Williamson) and educated at Westminster School (1727–35) and Lincoln's Inn (1736).

Military career
Harvey was commissioned as a cornet in the 10th Dragoons in 1741 and rose through the ranks to be promoted lieutenant-general in 1772. As a lieutenant he served as aide-de-camp to the Duke of Cumberland at the Battle of Culloden in 1746.

His military career culminated in him becoming Adjutant-General to the Forces in 1763: he died in office in 1778. He was given the colonelcy of the 12th Regiment of Dragoons from 1763 to 1764, of the 6th Dragoon Guards from 1764 to 1775 and of the 6th (Inniskilling) Dragoons from 1775 to his death. He was also Governor of Portsmouth from 1773 to his death.

Parliamentary career
He was elected Member of Parliament for Gatton between 1761 and 1768 and for Harwich between 1768 and 1778.

References

 

1718 births
1778 deaths
People educated at Westminster School, London
Members of Lincoln's Inn
Members of the Parliament of Great Britain for English constituencies
British MPs 1754–1761
British MPs 1761–1768
British MPs 1768–1774
British MPs 1774–1780
12th Royal Lancers officers
6th (Inniskilling) Dragoons officers
Carabiniers (6th Dragoon Guards) officers
British Army lieutenant generals
British Army personnel of the Jacobite rising of 1745